SLNS Gajabahu (named after Gajabahu, a former king of Sri Lanka) was a  of the Sri Lanka Navy. She has since been converted to a training ship for the Naval & Maritime Academy, Trincomalee. She was originally HMCS Hallowell of the Royal Canadian Navy, built during the Second World War and then saw service as INS Miznak of the Israeli Navy. The Royal Ceylon Navy purchased her in 1958 from Israel.

Construction and career

Royal Canadian Navy and Israeli Navy
HMCS Hallowell was ordered on 1 February 1943 as part of the 1943-44 River-class building program by the Royal Canadian Navy (RCN). She was laid down by Canadian Vickers Ltd. aT Montreal on 22 November 1943 and launched 28 March 1944. She was commissioned into the RCN on 8 August 1944 at Montreal.

After working up at Bermuda, Hallowell was assigned to the Mid-Ocean Escort Force (MOEF) escort group C-1 as the Senior Officer's Ship. From late November 1944 until June 1945, she was continuously employed as a convoy escort on North Atlantic convoys. In June 1945 she returned to Canada and from July to August transported troops from St. John's to Canada. She was paid off at Sydney, Nova Scotia on 7 November 1945 and placed in reserve at Shelburne, Nova Scotia.

After the war she was sold to Uruguayan interests in 1946 before being re-sold to a Palestinian group in 1949 for conversion to a short-service ferry in the Mediterranean Sea. She was renamed Sharon and remained in service until 1952, when she was purchased by the Israeli Navy, rearmed and commissioned as INS Miznak and given the designation K-32. She remained in service until 1958.

Royal Ceylon Navy
Purchased from the Israeli Navy in 1958–3 years after another River-class frigate, HMCyS Mahasena—she was commissioned as HMCyS Gajabahu into the Royal Ceylon Navy. She participated in many flag-showing missions in various countries, including a cruise to Japan. Gajabahu also took part in many international naval exercises.

Following the failed military coups d'état in 1962 in which the former Captain of the Navy (as the Commander of the Navy was known then) was implicated, the government undertook a program of downsizing the military. As a result, Gajabahu became the flagship of the fleet and only major warship of the Royal Ceylon Navy after Mahasena and Parakram were sold off and Vijaya was lost in a storm. During the 1971 Insurrection she could not be deployed to sea since her crew were dispatched for ground duty due to personnel shortages. "HMCyS Gajabahu" became "SLNS Gajabahu" when Sri Lanka became a republic in 1972. In the 1980s she was taken out of active service to be converted to a training ship for the Naval and Maritime Academy, Trincomalee.

References

External links
Sri Lanka Navy

 

Ships of the Royal Canadian Navy
Ships built in Quebec
1944 ships
River-class frigates of the Sri Lanka Navy
Training ships